Matthew David McGorry (born April 12, 1986) is an American actor, writer and activist. He is best known for playing John Bennett in the Netflix comedy-drama series Orange Is the New Black and Asher Millstone in the ABC legal thriller series How to Get Away with Murder.

Early life and education
McGorry was born and raised in the Manhattan borough of New York City, and began performing at age nine. He attended Fiorello H. LaGuardia High School in New York, and then graduated from Emerson College in Boston, Massachusetts in 2008.

Career

Fitness
McGorry began his career as a personal trainer, fitness writer for Men's Journal, and competitive bodybuilder.

Acting
On television, McGorry made his debut in 2011 on the ABC daytime soap opera One Life to Live. He later appeared in guest-starring roles on Person of Interest, Gossip Girl, and Royal Pains before breaking out in a recurring role from 2013 to 2015 on the Netflix dramedy series Orange Is the New Black as corrections officer John Bennett in 2013.

In 2014, McGorry was cast as series regular Asher Millstone on Shonda Rhimes' drama series How to Get Away with Murder, a role he played for 90 episodes up until 2020. In the same year, he was cast in the indie drama How He Fell in Love.

In 2022, McGorry starred as Mark Higgins for 8 episodes in Archive 81.

Personal life
McGorry is heterosexual, but stated in a 2018 Man Talk roundtable that he had experimented with men when he was younger, adding, "like a lot of straight boys I experimented with other boys. But that is so common and no one talks about it [...] I don't think it was sexual, and I am straight never found myself attracted to boys [...] I had so much shame about that, for years after, thinking 'I'm going to be famous one day, maybe, and someone's going to find and it's going to become this thing and it's going to destroy me."

McGorry is a police and prison abolitionist and a feminist and is interested in various social issues.

Filmography

Film

Television

References

External links

1986 births
Living people
21st-century American male actors
American bodybuilders
20th-century American Jews
American male film actors
American male television actors
Emerson College alumni
Fiorello H. LaGuardia High School alumni
Jewish feminists
Male actors from New York City
Male feminists
People from Manhattan
21st-century American Jews
Police abolitionists